Ensley is a census-designated place (CDP) in Escambia County, Florida. It is a community in Pensacola, and is located northwest of Pensacola City Limits. As of the 2010 United States Census, the population was 20,602. It is part of the Pensacola–Ferry Pass–Brent Metropolitan Statistical Area. Ensley is a transportation corridor for the Pensacola Area, with US-90 ALT, US-29, and Interstate 10 running through Ensley.

Geography
Ensley is located at  (30.523395, -87.273492).

Demographics

As of the census of 2000, there were 18,752 people, 7,533 households, and 5,039 families residing in the CDP. The racial makeup of the CDP was 66.90% White, 28.44% African American, 0.92% Native American, 1.15% Asian, 0.05% Pacific Islander, 0.64% from other races, and 1.90% from two or more races. Hispanic or Latino of any race were 2.08% of the population.

There were 7,533 households, out of which 29.9% had children under the age of 18 living with them, 45.9% were married couples living together, 16.5% had a female householder with no husband present, and 33.1% were non-families. 26.4% of all households were made up of individuals, and 8.7% had someone living alone who was 65 years of age or older.  The average household size was 2.48 and the average family size was 3.00.

In the CDP, the population was spread out, with 25.2% under the age of 18, 9.9% from 18 to 24, 29.9% from 25 to 44, 22.7% from 45 to 64, and 12.3% who were 65 years of age or older.  The median age was 36 years. For every 100 females, there were 91.5 males.  For every 100 females age 18 and over, there were 88.3 males.

The median income for a household in the CDP was $30,632, and the median income for a family was $37,607. Males had a median income of $30,056 versus $20,667 for females. The per capita income for the CDP was $16,245.  About 12.0% of families and 15.7% of the population were below the poverty line, including 23.3% of those under age 18 and 9.2% of those age 65 or over.

Hurricanes 
Ensley's location on the Florida Panhandle makes it vulnerable to hurricanes. Major hurricanes which have made landfall at or near Pensacola include Eloise (1975), Frederic (1979), Elena, Juan (1985), Erin (1995), Opal (1995), Georges (1998), Ivan (2004), Dennis (2005), and (Sally) (2020).

Climate

References

Pensacola metropolitan area
Census-designated places in Escambia County, Florida
Census-designated places in Florida